Iheme Faith Uloma (born 23 July 1992) better known as Ifu Ennada is a Nigerian film actress and fashion designer and a former BBNaija housemate. She is also an actress, known for winning the AMAA award for Best Young and Promising Actor in the movie O-Town.

Early life and career 
Ennada was born in Abia State, Nigeria but raised in Lagos. She studied Computer science at the Olabisi Onabanjo University where she obtained her BSc. She began her movie career in 2019 and in 2016, she was nominated for Best Young/Promising Actor in the movie O-Town at the AMAA awards 2016. In a 2018 interview, she revealed that she had been sexually harassed in 2016.

In 2018, she participated in the Big Brother Naija game show.

Filmography 
O-Town (2015) - Amara

Hire a Woman (2019) - Jane

The Lost Okoroshi (2019) - Sarafina

Tinsel - Prisca

Lonely Heart 

Mad About You

Awards and nominations

References

External links 

Living people
Nigerian film actresses
Nigerian television actresses
Year of birth missing (living people)
Nigerian fashion designers
Olabisi Onabanjo University alumni
21st-century Nigerian actresses
Actresses from Abia State
Participants in Nigerian reality television series
Big Brother (franchise) contestants
20th-century births
Igbo actresses